Lloyd Wolfe Bochner (July 29, 1924 – October 29, 2005) was a Canadian actor. He appeared in many Canadian and Hollywood productions between the 1950s and 1990s, including the films Point Blank (1967), The Detective (1968), The Young Runaways (1968), Ulzana's Raid (1972) and Satan's School for Girls (1973), and the television prime time soap opera Dynasty (1981–82). Bochner also voiced Mayor Hamilton Hill in Batman: The Animated Series (1992–95) and its follow-up The New Batman Adventures (1997–99).

Career 
At the age of 11, Bochner began his acting career on Ontario radio programs. He went on to garner two Liberty Awards, the highest acting honour in Canada, for his work in Canadian film and theatre. Bochner served in the Royal Canadian Navy during World War II. In 1946, he made his debut with The Mapleville Story and in 1951 he moved to New York City where he appeared in early television series such as One Man's Family and Kraft Television Theatre. In 1960, ABC called with a starring role in the series Hong Kong with co-star Rod Taylor. Faced against NBC's Wagon Train, then one of the most highly rated programs on the air, Hong Kong ended with the 26th episode. In 1961, he guest-starred in The Americans, an American Civil War drama about how the conflict divided families, starring Darryl Hickman.

A few years later, Bochner appeared in one of his most famous roles, that of a cryptographer attempting to decipher an alien text in the classic 1962 Twilight Zone episode "To Serve Man", a part he spoofed years later in the comedy The Naked Gun 2½: The Smell of Fear. In 1962 and 1963, he appeared in two episodes of the CBS anthology series, GE True, hosted by Jack Webb; he portrayed the part of Stoughton in "Code Name: Christopher, Part I" and Captain Ian Stuart in "Commando".

From 1963 to 1964, Bochner was a member of the repertory cast of NBC's The Richard Boone Show. In 1964, he guest-starred in the Voyage to the Bottom of the Sea season-one episode "The Fear-Makers". Later that year, he appeared as murderer Eric Pollard in the Perry Mason episode, "The Case of the Latent Lover". In 1965, he guest-starred on ABC's Western series The Legend of Jesse James starring Christopher Jones in the title role. Two years later, he appeared on the ABC military-Western Custer starring Wayne Maunder in the title role. He appeared twice on the long-running television Western The Virginian in the 1960s. Bochner is also memorably smooth and malicious as the gangster Carter against Lee Marvin in John Boorman's seminal 1960s film noir Point Blank. In 1971, Bochner appeared as Abel Wilks in "The Men From Shiloh" (rebranded name for The Virginian) in the episode titled "The Town Killer."

Over the years, Bochner continued to portray a variety of roles in television and film, from a warlock on Bewitched to a homosexual doctor coming out at middle age in the 1977 television movie Terraces, to Pia Zadora's abusive screenwriter husband in the camp classic film The Lonely Lady. In 1960, he starred in an adaptation of A. J. Cronin's The Citadel along with Ann Blyth. His son Paul said he "almost always played a suave, handsome, wealthy villain."

Notable roles
Bochner played the scheming Cecil Colby on Dynasty. The character suffered a heart attack while having sex with Alexis Carrington (Joan Collins), and later died in his hospital bed seconds after marrying her. A few years later, Bochner planned to star as C.C. Capwell on the daytime drama Santa Barbara, but a heart attack caused his departure from the series. Bochner continued to appear in television series for the next few decades, doing frequent voiceover work for the highly acclaimed animated series Batman: The Animated Series and The New Batman Adventures. He joined the Stratford Festival of Canada in its first season in 1953 and spent six years there, playing Horatio in Hamlet, Orsino in Twelfth Night, and Duke Vincentio in Measure for Measure opposite James Mason.

Television roles
In 1962, Bochner played in The Twilight Zone episode, "To Serve Man." In 1965, he guest starred on Combat! in the fourth season episode "Evasion" as Major Thorne. In 1966 on The Wild Wild West he played Zachariah Skull, an ingenious murderer, in "The Night of the Puppeteer." In 1966, Bochner played the author Robert Louis Stevenson in the episode "Jolly Roger and Wells Fargo" of Death Valley Days. That same year he appeared in 12 O'Clock High, playing the British officer, Major Mallory, episode "Fortress Weisbaden". In 1967, he appeared as a Royal Air Force officer and his German double on an episode of Hogan's Heroes in the episode "A Funny Thing Happened On the Way To London". In 1967, he played an 'U.N.C.L.E.' agent in the last season of The Man From U.N.C.L.E.; a unique role in that while he was a 'good guy' in the final dialogue he was described as being "reassuringly unlikeable". He also appeared three times on the TV series Mission: Impossible. 1969 "The Glass Cage", 1971 "Takeover" and 1972 "The Deal". In 1969, Bochner played a handsome warlock named Franklyn in the Bewitched season five episode, "Marriage Witches Style". In 1969, he played as the cat-loving bad guy Clayton Hewitt in the episode "Catspaw on It Takes a Thief and the final episode of same, "Project X", as Dr. George Kingsford in 1970. In 1970, Bochner played Walter Gregson, a strangler on Hawaii Five-O in the season three episode, "Beautiful Screamer". Later on Hawaii Five-O, he was the Navy captain in the 1975 episode, "Murder: Eyes Only". He also appeared in Hawaii Five-O season 12 in an episode called "Clash of the Shadows" as a Jewish diplomat. He appeared in the episode "Prosecutor" of the ABC crime drama The Silent Force in 1970. In 1973, he played a chess coach in Columbo: The Most Dangerous Match and was in the episode "The Pisces" of the short-lived TV show The Starlost. In 1974 and 1977, he appeared in four episodes of The Six Million Dollar Man; he portrayed Gavern Wilson in "Day of the Robot", Ulrich Rau in "Carnival of Spies", and Gordon Shanks in Deadly Countdown (part 1 and 2). In 1977, he was in an episode of the ABC crime drama The Feather and Father Gang and an episode of the ABC situation comedy The San Pedro Beach Bums. Bochner also appeared in Barnaby Jones in an episode titled "The Loose Connection"(03/18/1973).  He was Commandant Leiter in the Battlestar Galactica original-series episode "Greetings from Earth" (1978). In the 1980s, Bochner was in two episodes of The Golden Girls — as a suave television-turned-stage actor (and womanizer), Patrick Vaughn, in 1987 and as Eduardo the Hairdresser in 1989.

Personal life and death
Bochner was born in Toronto, Ontario, to a middle-class Jewish family, the son of Frieda ( Kenen) and Charles Abraham Bochner. His uncle was Isaiah L. Kenen, founder of the American Zionist Committee for Public Affairs.

In 1998, he co-founded the Committee to End Violence, a panel designed to study the impact violent images had on culture. He was also active in the Association of Canadian Radio and Television Artists and was a licensed amateur radio operator.

Bochner was married to Ruth Roher Bochner (1925-2017), a concert pianist, until his death from cancer on October 29, 2005, at the age of 81 at home in Santa Monica, California. Bochner and his wife had three children — Hart Bochner (actor, who also provided voices for Batman), Paul (director and animator), and Johanna.

Filmography

Film

Television

Awards 
Bochner received an ACTRA Award in 2004.

References

External links

CTV.ca Toronto-born actor Lloyd Bochner dies at 81
CBC Report on Lloyd Bochner's Death

 Bochner at The Canadian Encyclopedia

1924 births
2005 deaths
Canadian male film actors
Canadian male television actors
Canadian male voice actors
20th-century Canadian male actors
Deaths from cancer in California
Jewish Canadian male actors
Canadian people of Russian-Jewish descent
Male actors from Toronto
Burials at Westwood Village Memorial Park Cemetery
Canadian expatriate male actors in the United States